Yuri Yuryevich Shpiryuk (born 20 May 1970) is a Russian professional football coach and a former player. He is an assistant coach with FC SKA-Khabarovsk and the caretaker manager for FC SKA-Khabarovsk-2.

Club career
He made his professional debut in the Soviet Second League in 1988 for FC SKA Khabarovsk.

References

1970 births
Sportspeople from Khabarovsk
Living people
Soviet footballers
Russian footballers
Russian Premier League players
FC Okean Nakhodka players
FC Luch Vladivostok players
FC Sibir Novosibirsk players
FC SKA-Khabarovsk players
FC Yugra Nizhnevartovsk players
Association football forwards
Association football midfielders
FC Smena Komsomolsk-na-Amure players